Balobanaian is a largest village of Sarai Alamgir. It is almost 22 km from the town.

References 

Populated places in Gujrat District